Skåla may refer to:
 Skåla (Møre og Romsdal), a mountain in Volda municipality, Møre og Romsdal county, Norway
 Skåla (Vestland), a mountain in Stryn municipality, Vestland county, Norway

See also 
 Skála, a village in the Faroe Islands
 Skala (disambiguation)